96five (call sign: 4FRB) is a Christian community radio station operated by Family Radio Ltd in Brisbane, Australia. The radio station is funded by sponsorship, advertisements, donations, fundraising and pledges. A separate program output is aired on the stations DAB+ Digital Radio channel called Inspire.

Programming

Family FM (identified on-air as 96five) describes itself as a "family-friendly broadcaster" and "music safe for little ears", with programming content suitable for all ages. The station's music playlist consists of music from contemporary Christian artists as well as mainstream artists. The station claims that listeners will hear no bad language.

The schedule also features numerous family segments and messages from family and ministry figures, which air every hour, and specialist programs such as Focus on the Family and Talking Life that deal with Christian, mental health and family issues. The station also airs regular outside broadcasts at events and locations including primary schools and community events.

Studios
The station's studios are in the north Brisbane suburb of Alderley. The station's transmission facilities are located at a shared broadcast facility on Mt. Coot-tha.

Community outreach
The radio station organises and liaises with a number of community outreach programs and initiatives through its ministry. The breakfast show SOS Calls assists an individual or family in need. The station operates Street Machines, which are promotional vehicles that distribute prizes. The station also has media partnerships with Brisbane and international non-profit organisations including SU QLD, Red Frogs, CBM Miracles Day and Compassion.

See also
 List of radio stations in Australia

References

External links

Radio stations in Brisbane
Community radio stations in Australia
Christian radio stations in Australia
Radio stations established in 2001
2001 establishments in Australia
English-language radio stations